The Body Stealers, also known as Thin Air, is a 1969 British science fiction film directed by Gerry Levy, about the disappearance of British armed forces paratroopers in mid-air whilst on a routine jump. Two investigators try to figure out what happened and uncover an alien plot to steal bodies of earthlings by snatching them out of the air. The film was also released as Invasion of the Body Stealers.

Plot
When British paratroopers disappear in mid-air during routine jumps, former air force investigator Bob Megan (Patrick Allen) is brought in to solve the mystery. While making inquiries at a military research laboratory headed by Dr Matthews (Maurice Evans), he has several encounters with a woman called Lorna (Lorna Wilde) who vanishes after each meeting.

One of the troopers is found barely alive and dies on arrival at the laboratory. An autopsy performed by Dr Julie Slade (Hilary Dwyer) reveals that the man's biochemistry had been altered. Megan learns that all of the missing troopers had received spaceflight training, leading Matthews to theorise that they are being adapted to survive in a non-Earth environment.

Travelling to Matthews' cottage, Slade discovers that the human Matthews has been killed and his form assumed by an alien called Marthus. When Megan arrives, Marthus explains that the troopers were abducted as part of a plan to re-populate his home planet, Mygon, which has been devastated by plague. Marthus attempts to kill Megan and Slade but is incapacitated by Lorna, who is revealed to be his alien companion. Lorna shows Megan the surviving troopers, who are being held in suspended animation, as well as her and Marthus' spacecraft. Megan asks Lorna to return the troopers in exchange for his promise to find a group of volunteers to assist her with the re-population. Lorna agrees and vanishes once again, taking Marthus and the spacecraft with her.

Cast

 George Sanders as General Armstrong
 Maurice Evans as Dr Matthews and Marthus
 Patrick Allen as Bob Megan
 Neil Connery as Jim Radford
 Hilary Dwyer as Dr Julie Slade
 Robert Flemyng as Wing Commander Baldwin
 Lorna Wilde as Lorna
 Allan Cuthbertson as Hindesmith
 Michael Culver as Lieutenant Bailes
 Sally Faulkner as Joanna
 Shelagh Fraser as Mrs Thatcher
 Carl Rigg as Briggs
 Carol Hawkins as Paula
 Dixon Adams as David
 Derek Pollitt as Davies
 Johnnie Wade as Orderly
 Clifford Earl as Sergeant in Laboratory

Trivia
The alien spacecraft is the Dalek flying saucer from the film Daleks' Invasion Earth 2150 A.D. (1966).

Critical reception
Alan Jones of Radio Times gives the film one star out of five, calling it a "talky, laughably low-budget and hopelessly inept clone of Invasion of the Body Snatchers".

Time Out describes it as a "threadbare Anglo-American enterprise with too much vapid chat and too little action" that "[ends] very feebly (in a British sort of way)".

References

External links

1960s science fiction films
1969 films
Alien abduction films
Alien visitations in films
British science fiction films
Films set in England
1960s English-language films
1960s British films